The Armstrong Siddeley Sapphire is a large automobile which was produced by the British company, Armstrong Siddeley Motors Limited, from 1952 to 1960.

A distinctive element of the Sapphires was the traditional Armstrong Siddeley V-shaped radiator grille with the Sphinx motif mounted on it.

On some models the sphinx sported aircraft wings carrying tiny Armstrong Siddeley Sapphire jet engines.

Sapphire 234 

The Sapphire 234 and 236 were two cars identical in appearance but sold with different engines having different performance characteristics. The 234 could be purchased with wire wheels as an optional extra.

The 234 was produced from 1955 to 1958 and used a four-cylinder 2,290 cc version of the 346 engine. The transmission was a manual four-speed gearbox with optional overdrive.

A 100 mph car intended for the man who liked high performance.

803 were produced.

Sapphire 236 

The 236 was made between 1955 and 1957 and used the six-cylinder 2,310 cc engine previously seen in the Armstrong Siddeley Whitley. A conventional manual gearbox was available but many were fitted with a Lockheed Manumatic "clutchless" transmission. Overdrive was an option on either transmission.

This car with an 85 mph maximum was intended to be a quiet, flexible, easy-to-drive saloon.

603 were produced.

Sapphire 346 

The 346 was the first of the Sapphires introduced late in 1952 for sale in 1953 and continuing until 1958. The front suspension was independent coil springs with a rigid axle and leaf springs at the rear. The Girling hydraulic brakes used  drums all round.

The body was available as a four- or six-light (two or three windows on each side) at the same cost and with either a bench or individual front seats. The seats were finished in leather, with the dashboard and door-cappings in walnut veneer. A heater was standard.

It was introduced with the choice of a Wilson electrically-controlled finger-tip four-speed  pre-selector gearbox as a £30 option, or four-speed synchromesh gearbox. It became available with automatic transmission (a Rolls-Royce-made Hydramatic four-speed) with the introduction of the Mark II in 1954.

A long-wheelbase model was launched in 1955 as a limousine version which had the pre-selector gearbox as standard, however, there was an optional four-speed manual column-change gearbox available. It featured a longer wheelbase (extended by 21 inches or 535 mm) chassis with a body incorporating a limousine division.

Models for export to the U.S. were always delivered with twin carburettors.

The test car cost £1,757 including taxes.

7,697 were produced.

Star Sapphire 

The Star Sapphire saloon was announced on 17 October 1958 and production continued through to the summer of 1960. It retained the previous model's commanding driving position. Though little changed externally, the radiator grille no longer rose to the top of the bonnet, many refinements were incorporated.
 
The six-cylinder engine was enlarged more than 16% to 3,990 cc with larger twin Stromberg carburettors as standard and power output increased to [SAE] 165 bhp (167 hp, 123 kW), or [DIN] 145 bhp (147 hp, 108 kW). Perhaps more important was an increase of nearly 30% in torque at 50 m.p.h. Big end and main bearings were now made of lead indium and a vibration damper fitted to the nose of the crankshaft. The compression ratio was raised to 7.5 to 1. The car could now lap the Lindley high speed track at 104 m.p.h.

Various suspension modifications had been carried out. Servo-assisted  Girling disc brakes were now installed on the front wheels and Burman recirculating ball power steering was standardised with a turning circle reduced by 4'6". A BorgWarner type DG automatic gearbox was fitted which incorporated a lever on the facia to hold intermediate gear at 35, 45, 55, and 65 m.p.h.

Door hinges were now concealed and the front doors now hinged at their leading edge. There was an independent heater for the rear passengers and demisting slots for the rear window. All features were standard, the provision of alternatives being believed to lead to an unsatisfactory compromise.

902 saloons were produced, as well as 77 long-wheelbase cars, 73 of which were built as limousines (including 2 prototypes). The limousine version was made in 1960 only and had a single-carburettor engine and manual gearbox (the automatic gearbox was fitted to 12 examples). The remaining 4 chassis were used for 3 hearses and an ambulance.
980 Star Sapphires were produced.

The Star Sapphire won the £4,000 four-door coachwork class at the 1958 Earls Court Motor Show ahead of a Princess limousine and a Jaguar Mark IX.

A Star Sapphire saloon with automatic transmission was tested by the British magazine The Motor in 1959. The test car cost £2,498 including taxes of £735. By then purchase tax had been reduced by one-sixth on 8 April 1959.

Market sector
Prices including tax October 1958
 £2,646 Star Sapphire
 £2,492 Daimler Majestic
 £2,163 Jaguar Mark IX with automatic transmission
 £1,939 Jaguar XK150
 £1,666 Humber Super Snipe with automatic transmission

Star Sapphire Mk. II 

The Mk II version did not get beyond prototype stage in 1960 and only one was produced.

In Film and Books 
 Diamonds Are Forever by Ian Fleming
 In chapter 6, 'In Transit', James Bond gets picked up at the Ritz Hotel in London by a chauffeur-driven black Armstrong Siddeley Sapphire. The year and mark of the car are not noted but the novel was published in 1956. The car has red dealer plates.
 1956 British film Wicked as They Come
 Kathy Allen, played by Arlene Dahl is picked at the London Airport and dropped of at  The May Fair Hotel in a black Armstrong Siddeley Limousine.

References

External links 
 Armstrong Siddeley Sphinx motif
 retrospective history, focusing on early Sapphire engines
 A-Z of Cars 1945–1970. Bay View Books 1986. Michael Sedgwick and Mark Gillies. 

Sapphire
1950s cars
1960s cars
Limousines